The Marshall Thundering Herd softball team represents Marshall University in NCAA Division I college softball. The team participates in the Sun Belt Conference. They are currently coached by head coach Megan Smith. They play their home games at Dot Hicks Field. The Thundering Herd have made two NCAA Tournament appearances, most recently in 2017.

Year-by-year results

National Awards
All-Americans
Mya Stevenson, OF - 2022 NFCA/Louisville Slugger All-American Third Team
Morgan Zerkle, SS - 2017 NFCA/Louisville Slugger All-American Second Team
Jordan Dixon, P - 2017 NFCA/Louisville Slugger All-American Third Team
Rachel Folden, C - 2006, 2007 NFCA/Louisville Slugger All-American Second Team; 2005, 2008 NFCA/Louisville Slugger All-American Third Team

NFCA Golden Shoe Award
Morgan Zerkle – 2015
Elicia D'Orazio – 2017

References

External links
 Official website

 
Sports clubs established in 1994